The 6th Jat Light Infantry were an infantry regiment of the Bengal Army, later of the united British Indian Army. They could trace their origins to 1803, when they were the 1st Battalion, 22nd Bengal Native Infantry. Over the years they were known  by a number of different names the 43rd Bengal Native Infantry 1824–1842, the 43rd Bengal Native (Light) Infantry 1842–1861, the 6th Bengal Native (Light) Infantry 1861– after the Kitchener reforms of the Indian Army the 6th Jat Bengal (Light) Infantry. The regiment was involved in the First Anglo-Afghan War, the First Anglo-Sikh War, the Second Anglo-Afghan War, the Boxer Rebellion and World War I. After World War I the Indian Government reformed the army moving from single battalion regiments to multi battalion regiments. The 6th Jat Light Infantry became the new 1st Battalion, 9th Jat Regiment. After India gained independence they were one of the regiments allocated to the Indian Army.

See also
 Jat people
 Jat Regiment
 List of Jats
 Jat Mahasabha
 World Jat Aryan Foundation
 Dev Samhita
 Origin of Jat people from Shiva's Locks
 Jat reservation agitation
 20th Lancers
 10th Jats
 14th Murray's Jat Lancers
 9th Jat Regiment

References

British Indian Army infantry regiments
Honourable East India Company regiments
Military units and formations established in 1803
Military units and formations of the Boxer Rebellion
Military units and formations disestablished in 1922
Bengal Presidency
1803 establishments in the British Empire